Diarmait Ó Cobhthaigh (fl. 1584) was an Irish poet.

Ó Cobhthaigh was a member of a hereditary bardic family, based in what is now County Westmeath but was once the heartland of the original kingdom of Mide. The family were from the district known as Fir Thulach.

Dairmait was the author of a lament for his murdered relative, Uaithne Ó Cobhthaigh (died 1556), which begins Dá néll orcha ós iath Uisnigh/Two clouds of woe over the land of Uisneach. His other work included five theological poems:

  ("Safeguard of children in the death of their father"), which consisted of one hundred and sixty verses.
  ("The cost of life the death of a lord")
  ("Alas! the pleader is facing the judge")
  ("Alas! that I did not go to the king's house")
  ("A powerful argument the tributes of a king")

Extant versions of some of these poems are held by the Royal Irish Academy.

See also

 An Clasach Ó Cobhthaigh (died 1415
 Maeleachlainn Ó Cobhthaigh (died 1429

References

 Ó Cobhthaigh family, pp. 435–436, in Oxford Dictionary of National Biography, volume 41, Norbury-Osbourne, September 2004.

16th-century Irish writers
People from County Westmeath
Irish-language poets
Irish religious writers
People of Elizabethan Ireland